The 2020–21 season was Forest Green Rovers' 132nd season in their history and the fourth consecutive season in EFL League Two. Along with League Two, the club also participated in this season's editions of the FA Cup, EFL Cup and EFL Trophy.

The season covers the period from 1 July 2020 to 30 June 2021.

Transfers

Transfers in

Loans in

Loans out

Transfers out

Pre-season

Competitions

EFL League Two

League table

Results summary

Results by matchday

Matches

The 2020–21 season fixtures were released on 21 August.

Play-offs

FA Cup

The first round draw was made on 26 October 2020.

EFL Cup

The first round draw was made on 18 August, live on Sky Sports, by Paul Merson.

EFL Trophy

The regional group stage draw was confirmed on 18 August. The second round draw was made by Matt Murray on 20 November, at St Andrew’s.

Statistics

Appearances and goals

Last updated 23 May 2021.

|-
! colspan=14 style=background:#dcdcdc; text-align:center| Goalkeepers

|-

! colspan=14 style=background:#dcdcdc; text-align:center| Defenders

|-

! colspan=14 style=background:#dcdcdc; text-align:center| Midfielders

|-

! colspan=14 style=background:#dcdcdc; text-align:center| Forwards

|}

Top scorers
Includes all competitive matches. The list is sorted by squad number when total goals are equal.

Last updated 23 May 2021.

Cleansheets
Includes all competitive matches. The list is sorted by squad number when total cleansheets are equal.

Last updated 23 May 2021.

Disciplinary record
Includes all competitive matches.

Last updated 23 May 2021.

References

Forest Green Rovers
Forest Green Rovers F.C. seasons